The uterine artery is an artery that supplies blood to the uterus in females.

Structure
The uterine artery usually arises from the anterior division of the internal iliac artery. It travels to the uterus, crossing the ureter anteriorly, to the uterus by traveling in the cardinal ligament.

It travels through the parametrium of the inferior broad ligament of the uterus.

It commonly anastomoses (connects with) the ovarian artery.

The uterine artery is the major blood supply to the uterus and enlarges significantly during pregnancy.

Branches and organs supplied
 round ligament of the uterus
 ovary ("ovarian branches")
 uterus (arcuate vessels)
 vagina (Vaginal branches of uterine artery)
 uterine tube ("tubal branch")

Anatomical variants
Uterine artery can arise from the first branch of inferior gluteal artery. It can also arise as the 2nd or 3rd branch from the inferior gluteal artery. On the other hand, uterine artery can be first branch from internal iliac artery before the superior and inferior gluteal arteries branching off from the main arterial trunk. In addition to that, uterine artery can also arise directly from internal iliac artery together with superior and inferior gluteal arteries.

Clinical significance

Hysterectomy 
The uterine arteries are ligated during hysterectomy.

See also
Uterine artery embolization
Uterine leiomyomata (fibroids of the uterus)

References

External links
  - "The Female Pelvis: Branches of Internal Iliac Artery"
 

Arteries of the abdomen
Uterus